José Amado Benardete (1928 - 2016) was an American philosopher and Emeritus Professor of Philosophy at Syracuse University.
He was the son of Maír José Benardete and the brother of Seth Benardete and Diego Benardete, professor of mathematics at the University of Hartford.
Benardete was known for his works on metaphysics.

Books
 Greatness of Soul in Hume, Aristotle and Hobbes (Cambridge Scholars Publishing, 2013)
 Metaphysics: The Logical Approach (Oxford University Press, 1989)
 Infinity: An Essay in Metaphysics (Oxford University Press, 1964)

References

External links
Personal Website

1928 births
2016 deaths
American people of Turkish-Jewish descent
American philosophy academics
Jewish philosophers
Syracuse University faculty
University of Virginia alumni
Metaphysicians
20th-century American philosophers
Place of birth missing
Place of death missing
Date of birth missing
Date of death missing